Vladimir Privman (2 January 1955 – 14 April 2018) was a professor of physics at Clarkson University, where he held the Robert A. Plane Endowed Professorship. He also held joint appointments in the departments of Chemistry and Electrical and Computer Engineering. He was best known for his work on bio-inspired information processing, synthesis of colloids and nanoparticles, spintronics and quantum computing, statistical mechanics, polymer science, and chemical kinetics. He also made numerous contributions to the field of unconventional computing. In total, he authored over 250 academic papers and books.

Privman earned his doctorate in 1982 from The Technion. He completed postdoctoral work at Cornell University and Caltech before joining the faculty at Clarkson University in 1985. Early in his career, he received the Royal Society University Research Fellowship. In 2006, he became a fellow of the American Physical Society, an honor bestowed on less than one-half of one percent of the society's membership. He was recognized for his "fundamental contributions and professional leadership in statistical physics, surface, colloid and polymer science, and quantum information science."

References

External links
Home page

1955 births
2018 deaths
Clarkson University faculty
Technion – Israel Institute of Technology alumni
Engineers from Lviv
21st-century American physicists
Ukrainian SSR emigrants to Israel
20th-century Ukrainian engineers
21st-century Ukrainian engineers
Israeli emigrants to the United States
Fellows of the American Physical Society